The shooting of Bich Cau Thi Tran (also known as Cau Bich Tran) occurred in San Jose, California, on July 13, 2003. She was fatally shot by a San Jose Police officer in her home. Tran was wielding an Asian vegetable peeler at two police officers and was then shot once in the chest. The incident led to controversy among the Vietnamese American community in San Jose, accusing the officer of using excessive force. The family of Tran was awarded $1.8 million in a lawsuit filed against the city of San Jose.

Backgrounds
Tran was a 25-year-old Vietnamese immigrant who spoke little English. She immigrated to the United States in 1997, taking a job at the NUMMI assembly plant in Fremont, California. She was the mother of two boys, then 2 and 4 years old, with whom she lived with in an apartment, along with her boyfriend Dang Quang Bui. She had a history of mental health problems and had stopped taking anti psychotic medication. Tran had at least nine interactions with police from 2001 to 2003 due to mental health issues and outbursts, and had been hospitalized at least three times for mental health issues.

The two officers, Chad Marshall and Tom Mun, were employed by the San Jose Police Department. Marshall, then 30 years old, had four years of law enforcement experience, while Mun had two and a half years of experience.

Shooting
At 6:00p.m., Bich Cau Thi Tran was heard and seen by neighbors yelling in Vietnamese and waving her arms while roaming around the streets of their neighborhood. According to a neighbor, Tran was "marching zombielike down the sidewalk" and ignoring her youngest son, who was wandering in traffic at the intersection of Taylor and 12th Streets crying and asking for "his mommy." The neighbor told Tran to "go take care of your little babies," and Tran's boyfriend, Dang Quang Bui, took her into their family's home and drew the blinds. The neighbor phoned the police to report the wandering toddler, which prompted a dispatch to the scene to check on the welfare of the toddler. Tran's family stated that she had tried to enter an accidentally-locked bedroom from the outside, through the window, and had not noticed that one of her sons had followed her outside.

While officers were en route, Tran was heard by neighbors screaming in her home, prompting more calls to the police as a suspected domestic violence issue. Two officers arrived on scene in separate patrol cars. Officer Chad Marshall and Officer Tom Mun arrived at the East Taylor Street apartment complex where Tran lived with her boyfriend and the couple's two sons. The officers heard Tran acting distraught and pounding and screaming inside.

The officers pounded on the door for several minutes, and Mun asked Marshall if they should break it down. Tran's boyfriend, Dang Quang Bui, then opened the door and pointed the officers to the kitchen, where Tran was, stating that "she's crazy." Initial police reports stated that after police entered the apartment, Tran screamed at the officers to get out, and when they did not, she retrieved what looked like a cleaver out of a drawer and waved it at them. Tran's family disputed that account, saying that she had already been gesturing angrily with the utensil within the kitchen before officers arrived, as she had been employing it to try to pry the locked bedroom door open. Mun would later testify that she screamed at the officers to go away while shaking the raised blade, which Mun said appeared to be a kitchen knife. A knife expert would later testify the peeler "would have been able to cut a piece of meat". Mun believed she was about to throw the blade at either the officers, Bui, or the couple's two sons, all standing nearby. Marshall described the knife as a cleaver and said he thought she was raising it over her head in preparation to throw it at him. Within three or "seven to eight" seconds of entering the apartment, Marshall responded by firing one gunshot into Tran's chest, killing her.

According to Bui's testimony, Marshall did not warn Tran or demand that she drop the weapon before opening fire, although Mun said Marshall twice ordered Tran to "drop the knife." Bui also testified that Tran was gesturing in frustration at a locked bedroom door with the peeler, which she had tried to pry open before police arrived on scene. Bui testified that Tran had exhibited symptoms of mental illness after their second child was born in 2000, but would often stop taking her anti-psychotic medication because it made her tired. Bui related several incidents that occurred in 2001 requiring police responses to Tran's actions.

Officer Christopher Hardin responded to the scene just as the shooting occurred. He entered the apartment immediately after hearing gunfire, and described what he saw: Tran was lying on her back, "slowly shifting her head and limbs and gasping for breath" with Marshall's eyes "very large ... [looking] sad and scared at the same time" as Tran's sons were "screaming and clutching onto [Marshall's] legs." A responding paramedic, Maria Rios, testified that her dispatchers told her to wait outside the apartment for six minutes while police "secured" the scene. Rios would pronounce Tran dead fifteen minutes after the shooting. A pathologist, Dr. Richard Mason, testified the shot had pierced Tran's heart, fatally wounding her. The damage was so massive that emergency medical treatment would have been ineffective, even if the paramedics had not been delayed from entering the apartment.

Investigation
The Santa Clara County District Attorney's office held a criminal grand jury of 18 members to decide on whether or not Marshall should be indicted for the shooting death. The grand jury hearing was held publicly at the request of Santa Clara County District Attorney George Kennedy and the grand jury foreman to "... help eliminate any public concern or mistrust about the case." Santa Clara County Deputy District's Attorney Dan Nishigaya provided evidence to the grand jury over a two-week span. Nishigaya asked the officers why they did not choose to use pepper spray or other nonlethal tactics to subdue Tran, and Tom Mun testified that the incident "happened too quickly" and that it appeared to be an imminent threat that endangered the lives of the two officers and Tran's relatives.

During the presentation of testimony, grand jurors would ask why police kept referring to the vegetable peeler as a knife, and Nishigaya admonished a crime scene investigator for calling Tran "the suspect." A police training instructor, Officer Alan Soroka, brandished a training knife in response to a grand juror's question why the police did not shoot at the weapon instead. Soroka was attempting to demonstrate how difficult it would be to shoot the knife from an attacker's hand to explain why police are trained to shoot at the attacker's torso and not the weapon, but observers in the courtroom felt the testimony was highly prejudicial as the instructor was wielding a combat-style training knife.

On October 30, 2003, the grand jury declined to indict Marshall after two hours of deliberation on charges of either manslaughter or murder in Tran's death after a seven-day proceeding.

Tran's family filed a civil lawsuit on November 12, 2003 against the city of San Jose, Officer Chad Marshall, and the San Jose Chief of Police, alleging wrongful death. The lawsuit also accused the police department of attempting to deflect blame by exaggerating the nature of the Tran's "weapon" (the police had called it a "large cleaver") and increasing the time elapsed between entering the apartment and the shooting (the police had said 55 seconds elapsed). In 2005, Tran's family was awarded $1,825,000. $800,000 of it went to Tran's sons. According to San Jose Attorney Rick Doyle, the city wanted to avoid a "drawn-out case" and make sure Tran's sons would be provided for.

Reaction
Tran was buried on August 2, 2003 at Oak Hill Memorial Park. The Cau Bich Tran Memorial Fund was established in her memory.

The shooting lead to many protests organized by Vietnamese community leaders and immigrant activists, and distrust from some of the Vietnamese community leaders and citizens in the San Jose area, stating that the shooting was a result of excessive force. Three days after Tran was killed, 300 protesters marched from her apartment to the San Jose City Hall.

A vigil with 400 people was held for Tran within days of the shooting, notable as one of the first responses by the Vietnamese-American community to issues in America, as opposed to anti-communist activism targeting Vietnam.

The shooting led to the formation of the Coalition for Justice and Accountability, founded by Richard Konda, a director of the Asian Law Alliance. It was an organization that sought for justice in the case and demanded the San Jose Police Department to be culturally sensitive and adopt nonlethal tactics for subduing mentally disturbed people. The organization held multiple protests at the San Jose City Hall and in November 2003, after the grand jury declined to indict Chad Marshall, the ethnically diverse group called for a federal investigation of Tran's killing, contending that her history of interactions with the police, where she was angry yet remained nonviolent, illustrated that police were too quick to perceive ethnic minorities as inherently more threatening.

On August 11, 2015, Governor Jerry Brown signed Senate Bill 227 into law, making California the first state to ban the use of grand juries to indict officers facing charges for fatal shootings. The law effectively left the decision whether or not to present criminal charge(s) against officers involved in fatal shootings to the presiding district attorney.

See also
Shooting of Kuanchung Kao

References

Bibliography

External links
 
 
 
 
 

People shot dead by law enforcement officers in the United States
Law enforcement in California
21st century in San Jose, California
Deaths by firearm in California
Protests in the United States
2003 in California
American people of Vietnamese descent
Asian-American-related controversies